Tomki is a locality in northern New South Wales, Australia in Richmond Valley Shire. The name Tomki is derived from Bundjalung damgay, meaning "greedy".

References

Towns in New South Wales
Northern Rivers
Richmond Valley Council